Theekkadal is a 1980 Indian Malayalam-language film directed and produced by Navodaya Appachan under Navodaya Studio. The film stars Prem Nazir, Madhu, Sukumaran and Srividya.

Cast 
Prem Nazir as Balakrishnan
Madhu as Divakaran
Sukumaran as Varghese
Srividya as Sridevi
Kuthiravattam Pappu as Pappan
Ravi Kumar as Dr. Prasannan
Ambika as Sumam
Aranmula Ponnamma as Balakrishnan's Mother
Ratheesh
Bahadoor as Shekharan Pillai
Roopa
 Haseena Aman as Shobha
 Paravoor Bharathan as Kochu

Soundtrack 
The music was composed by Guna Singh.

References

External links 
 

1980 films
1980s Malayalam-language films
Films produced by Navodaya Appachan